Maleshevo Cove is a 2.5 km wide cove indenting for 1.1 km the north coast of Livingston Island in the South Shetland Islands, Antarctica. It is entered between Lukovit Point and Siddins Point.

The cove is named after the Maleshevo region in southwestern Bulgaria.

Location
A Spanish mapping was done in 1991 and Bulgarian ones in 2005 and 2009.

Map
 L.L. Ivanov. Antarctica: Livingston Island and Greenwich, Robert, Snow and Smith Islands. Scale 1:120000 topographic map.  Troyan: Manfred Wörner Foundation, 2009.

References
 Maleshevo Cove. SCAR Composite Gazetteer of Antarctica.
 Bulgarian Antarctic Gazetteer. Antarctic Place-names Commission. (details in Bulgarian, basic data in English)

External links
 Maleshevo Cove. Copernix satellite image

Coves of Livingston Island
Bulgaria and the Antarctic